Eugene Aram is a 1924 British silent drama film directed by Arthur Rooke and starring Arthur Wontner, Barbara Hoffe and Mary Odette. It was based on the 1832 novel Eugene Aram by Edward Bulwer-Lytton which depicts the life of the eighteenth century criminal Eugene Aram.

Cast
 Arthur Wontner as Eugene Aram 
 Barbara Hoffe as Madeleine Lester 
 Mary Odette as Elinor Lester 
 James Carew as Richard Houseman 
 C. V. France as Squire Lester 
 Walter Tennyson as Walter Lester 
 Lionel d'Aragon as Daniel Clarke 
 A. Bromley Davenport as Cpl. Bunting 
 William Matthews as John Courtland

References

Bibliography
 Low, Rachael. The History of British Film, Volume 4 1918-1929. Routledge, 1997.

External links

1924 films
1920s historical drama films
British historical drama films
British silent feature films
Films directed by Arthur Rooke
Films set in England
Films set in London
Films set in the 1740s
Films set in the 1750s
Films based on British novels
Films based on works by Edward Bulwer-Lytton
Crime films based on actual events
British black-and-white films
1924 drama films
1920s English-language films
1920s British films
Silent drama films